David Kelly may refer to:

Entertainers 
 David Kelly (actor) (1929–2012), Irish actor
 Matthew Kelly (born 1950 as David Kelly), English actor and television personality
 David Patrick Kelly (born 1951), American actor and musician

Sportsmen 
 David Kelly (Bahamian sailor) (1932–2009), Bahamian Olympic sailor
 David Kelly (Australian footballer) (born 1953), Australian footballer for Melbourne
 David Kelly (United States Virgin Islands sailor) (born 1955), United States Virgin Islands Olympic sailor
 David Kelly (association footballer) (born 1965), Irish association football player
 David Kelly (baseball announcer) (born 1967), American minor league baseball announcer
 David Kelly (Australian cricketer) (born 1959), Australian cricketer
 David Kelly (New Zealand cricketer) (born 1979), New Zealand cricketer
 David Kelly (Gaelic footballer) (born 1987), Gaelic footballer from Tubbercurry, County Sligo

Others 
 David Kelly (diplomat) (1891–1959), British diplomat
 David Kelly (mathematician), mathematics professor
 David Kelly (weapons expert) (1944–2003), British UN weapons inspector
 David M. Kelly (1841–?), Speaker of the Wisconsin State Assembly and member of the Wisconsin State Senate
 David Kelly (comic artist) (born 1965), American cartoonist and comics creator
 David Kelly (politician) (born 1956) West Virginia State Delegate

See also 
 David Kelley (disambiguation)
 Dave Kelly (disambiguation)